Al Sadda (in Arabic الصدى meaning The Echo) is a daily sports newspaper published in Sudan. In September 2011, the paper along with five other sports newspapers was suspended by the Sudan Press Council for allegedly violation of press law.

References

Newspapers published in Sudan
Sports mass media in Sudan
Arabic newspapers
Sports newspapers